Guru Films is a media company in film and television production, animation, publishing and digital media. The company is based out of Hyderabad.

In 2009-2010, Guru Films line produced for a Mumbai production house and the Hindi film, ‘Shor In The City’. 

Apart from movies in Hindi, Telugu and Tamil, the production house has also produced TV shows for Zee Telugu and Star Maa channels.

In 2019, Guru Films along with Suresh Productions, Kross Pictures, and People's Media Factory produced Oh! Baby, starring Samantha Akkineni in the titular role.

Collaborating again with Suresh Productions and Kross Pictures,  in 2021, Guru Films is producing the Telugu remake of Midnight Runners titled Saakini Daakini with Regina Cassandra and Nivetha Thomas in the titular roles in this action-comedy.

Film production

Television production

References

External links 
   Guru Films IMDb
   America Ammayi IMDb

Film production companies based in Hyderabad, India
Film production companies of India
Year of establishment missing